The 2014 CONCACAF Futsal Club Championship was the inaugural CONCACAF Futsal Club Championship, and was played from August 20 to 24, 2014, at the Domo Polideportivo de la CDAG at Guatemala City, Guatemala.

Participating teams
A total of six teams participated:
 Futsal Club Toronto
 Borussia
 Habana
 U.E.S.
 Glucosoral
 Sidekicks

Format
The six teams were divided into two groups of three, playing a round-robin format during the opening round of the tournament. The top two teams of each group advanced to the semifinals, followed by the third place match and the final a day later.

Group stage

Group A

Group B

Knockout stage

Bracket

Semifinals

Third place match

Final

References

External links
Futsal, CONCACAF.com

2014
2014 in futsal
2014